The Windsor Senior Masters was a men's senior (over 50) professional golf tournament on the European Seniors Tour, held at the Windsor Golf and Country Club, Kenya, north of the Nairobi, partly in Nairobi County and partly in Kiambu County. It was held just once, in March/April 1995, and was won by Brian Huggett who finished a shot ahead of Antonio Garrido.

Winners

External links
Coverage on the European Senior Tour's official site

Former European Senior Tour events
Golf tournaments in Kenya